Henry Syverson (5 October 1918 in Pine Bush, New York – 12 August 2007 in Pine Bush, New York) was an American cartoonist and illustrator, who contributed cartoons regularly to The Saturday Evening Post, This Week and many other periodicals. In World War II PFC Hank Syverson served with the US Army on Okinawa.

Syverson attended the Walt Disney Animation Studios in the company of many animators destined for fame in magazine cartooning - there were Sam Cobean and Eldon Dedini. Some graduated to syndicated fame, such as Walt Kelly (Pogo), Hank Ketcham (Dennis the Menace) and George Baker (Sad Sack).

External links
Will Finn blog
Gallery of cartoons

Publications
Post Scripts from the Saturday Evening Post -  John Bailey, Henry Syverson (Philadelphia, Macrae Smith, 1952)
The Saturday Evening Post Humour - John Bailey, Henry Syverson (Elek Books, London, 1956)
Aesop's Fables
Lovingly Yours - Henry Syverson (Henry Holt & Co. NY, 1957)
Bed, Breakfast and Bottled Water: A Cautionary Travel Guide to Europe - Kenneth R. Morgan, Henry Syverson (William Morrow & Co, 1963)
Touche - (C.R. Gibson Company, Norwalk, Connecticut, 1968)
What's So Funny About That? (1950s)
A Diabolical Dictionary of Education - Richard Armour, Henry Syverson (McGraw-Hill, 1969) 
The Spouse in the House - Richard Armour, Henry Syverson (McGraw-Hill, 1975)  / 0-07-002270-4

References

American cartoonists
1918 births
2007 deaths
People from Crawford, New York